Melancholy (Norwegian: Melankoli; also known as Jappe on the Beach, Jealousy or Evening) is a painting by the Norwegian artist Edvard Munch. Munch painted multiple variant versions of the expressionist work in oil on canvas during the period 1891–1893. The painting depicts a man with his head resting in his hand in a pensive mood at the edge of a shoreline. 

The inspiration for the painting was an unhappy romantic affair that Munch's friend, Jappe Nilssen, was involved in. In Munch's painting the figure of the melancholy man is at the right, and his mood is represented by the undulating shoreline and skylines that extend toward the left. Critics suggest that there are also erotic allusions, perhaps in the presence of the Moon reflected on the water. The landscape represents Asgardstrand's beach where Munch spent his summers from 1889. 

Melancholy was exhibited in 1891 at the Autumn Exhibition in Oslo. The artist and journalist Christian Krohg credited it as the first Symbolist painting by a Norwegian artist. Munch painted more than one version of the composition in 1891. A version completed in 1892–93 is in the National Gallery, Oslo.

Other versions

References 
  

Paintings by Edvard Munch
1891 paintings
Paintings in the collection of the National Gallery (Norway)
Ships in art